David Carr may refer to:

In academia
 David Carr (phenomenology scholar) (born 1940), American phenomenology scholar and philosopher
 David M. Carr, professor of Old Testament at Union Theological Seminary

In sport
 David Carr (wrestler) (born 1999), American folkstyle & freestyle wrestler
 David Carr (athlete) (born 1932), Australian track and field athlete
 David Carr (American football) (born 1979), American football quarterback

Other people
 David Carr (AIDS victim) (1933–1959), suspected first Western AIDS victim
 David Carr (journalist) (1956–2015), New York Times journalist
 David G. Carr (1809–1883), Virginia politician
 David Carr (born 1974), drummer for Christian band Third Day
 David Carr (politician), New York City councilman from the 50th Council District

See also
 Dave Carr (disambiguation)
 David & Carr, a duo consisting of trance musicians Peter Carr and David Johnson
 David Karr (1918–1979), American journalist, businessman, and Communist